Dame Ellen Dolour France  (née Larkin; born 1956) is a New Zealand jurist. She is currently a justice of the Supreme Court, and was previously the president of the Court of Appeal.

Biography 
Ellen Dolour Larkin was born to parents who were both teachers. A legal career was suggested to her by a career counsellor at Whanganui Girls' College, and her response was "alright, I'll try that." She graduated LLB from the University of Auckland in 1981, and obtained her masters from Queen's University in Ontario, Canada, in 1983. From 1982, she worked as a solicitor for the Auckland practice of Subritzky, Tetley Jones & Way.

From 1984, France was a legal adviser in the Department of Justice Law Reform Division, followed by work for the Crown Law Office.

In 2002, France was appointed to the High Court in Auckland. She received her appointment as a judge to the Court of Appeal in June 2006. She was appointed president of the Court of Appeal of New Zealand with effect from 1 September 2014, succeeding Sir Mark O'Regan. She made history in August 2015 when the Appeal Court bench was made up by three women when she sat with Justice Christine French and Justice Helen Winkelmann.

In the 2016 Queen's Birthday Honours, France was appointed a Dame Companion of the New Zealand Order of Merit, for services to the judiciary.

France's husband, Simon France, is a judge of the Court of Appeal. They met in their first year at Auckland University Law School in the late 1970s.

References

1956 births
University of Auckland alumni
Queen's University at Kingston alumni
Court of Appeal of New Zealand judges
Dames Companion of the New Zealand Order of Merit
Living people
People educated at Whanganui Girls' College
Supreme Court of New Zealand judges
High Court of New Zealand judges